San Pascual Academy is a Catholic and private high school located in barangay San Pascual, Ubay, in the province of Bohol, Philippines. Established in 1968, it became the second Catholic high school in the municipality of Ubay. The other one being, the Holy Child Academy which is located in barangay Poblacion. St. Vincent Ferrer Parish Church is just beside the school and supervised the institution.

References

External links
 

Schools in Bohol
High schools in Bohol
Ubay, Bohol
1968 establishments in the Philippines
Educational institutions established in 1968